Edward Bligh of Brittas (died 11 April 1872) was an Irish landowner who played first-class cricket for Cambridge University in the 1810s. He is recorded in one match in 1819, totalling 26 runs with a highest score of 20 and holding 4 catches.

He was the second son of Thomas Cherburgh Bligh, and Lady Theodosia, daughter of John Bligh, 3rd Earl of Darnley. He was educated at Eton College, and matriculated in 1818 at St John's College, Cambridge. On 9 August 1820 at Horsham, he married Sophia Eversfield (1792-1843), daughter of William Markwick, who had changed his surname to Eversfield. They had two children: 
 Theodosia Sophia Bligh (1821-1898), who in 1850 married Edward Tredcroft, and;
 Frederick Cherburgh Bligh (1828-1901) who in 1858 married Emily Matilda East, daughter of Hinton East.

References

1800 births
1872 deaths
Edward
People educated at Eton College
Irish cricketers
English cricketers of 1787 to 1825
Cambridge University cricketers
Alumni of St John's College, Cambridge
19th-century Irish landowners